Since 2014, Thomas Andersen from Venstre had been mayor of Aabenraa Municipality. He would stand to be re-elected. Venstre became the biggest party for the third election in a row, and kept 11 seats. 
After the election, the Conservatives and The New Right, who both gained 2 seats, attempted to find a majority outside of Venstre. As time passed, the Social Democrats, the Green Left
and Schleswig Party would join in, while Danish People's Party chose to stand out. An agreement, consisting of parties along the political spectrum, was reached between the Social Democrats, the Conservatives, the Green Left and The New Right, which would see Jan Riber Jakobsen from the Conservatives become mayor, despite the party only winning 11.6% of the vote.

This would mark the first time since the 2007 municipal reform, that a municipality in the South Jutland constituency would have a mayor from the Conservatives. It was one of three municipalities in the constituency where the Conservatives had mayor's elected in the 2021

Electoral system
For elections to Danish municipalities, a number varying from 9 to 31 are chosen to be elected to the municipal council. The seats are then allocated using the D'Hondt method and a closed list proportional representation.
Aabenraa Municipality had 31 seats in 2021

Unlike in Danish General Elections, in elections to municipal councils, electoral alliances are allowed.

Electoral alliances  

Electoral Alliance 1

Electoral Alliance 2

Electoral Alliance 3

Electoral Alliance 4

Results

Notes

References 

Aabenraa